Inti Wañunan (Quechua inti sun, wañuy to die, -na a suffix, "where the sun dies", -n a suffix, Hispanicized spelling Intihuañunan) is a  mountain in the Andes of Peru, about  high. It is situated in the Huancavelica Region, Huancavelica Province, Acobambilla District, and in the Junín Region, Huancayo Province, Chongos Alto District.

References

Mountains of Huancavelica Region
Mountains of Junín Region
Mountains of Peru